State Route 6 (SR 6) is part of Maine's system of numbered state highways, running from west to east across the state. Its western terminus is at the Canada–United States border near Sandy Bay (a terminus it shares with U.S. Route 201), where it connects to Quebec Route 173. Its eastern terminus is at the Canada-US border in Vanceboro, where it connects to New Brunswick Route 4. SR 6 is the only highway in Maine to terminate at the Canadian border at both ends. Much of SR 6 runs through isolated parts of the state.

More than two-thirds of the length of SR 6 is concurrent with other highways. Except for this section, locals generally refer to the roads by their other numbers.

History 
The SR 6 designation was first applied in 1937-8 on a short route in Old Orchard Beach which became part of SR 98 in 1946. In 1949, the number was applied to the modern routing between Lincoln and the New Brunswick border. In 1965, SR 6 was extended west to its modern terminus at the Quebec border by overlapping it entirely with existing highways. This remains its routing today.

Junction list

References

External links

Floodgap Roadgap's RoadsAroundME: Maine State Route 6

006
Transportation in Piscataquis County, Maine
Transportation in Penobscot County, Maine
Transportation in Washington County, Maine
Transportation in Somerset County, Maine